The Amazonas 5 is a Spanish commercial communications satellite developed by SSL and operated  by Hispasat. Its orbit allows it to cover all of South America, allowing for broadband and broadcast services. It replaces the Amazonas 4A and 4B satellites, the former of which experienced a performance loss and the latter which was cancelled.

Design

Satellite bus 
The satellite is based on the SSL 1300, a satellite bus produced by SSL.

Propulsion 
The satellite uses a chemical propulsion system for orbit raising with the main engine providing a force between 450 and 490 N and several altitude control thrusters. Although the SSL 1300 spacecraft bus can be equipped with an electric propulsion system, it is unknown if Amazonas 5 comes with it.

Communications 
The satellite's communication system is its main payload. It consists of 24 Ku band transponders for its South America beam and 34 Ka band spot beams for its Brazil beam. It can provide broadband and television services and can deploy 3G, LTE, and 5G networks.

Launch 
The launch was initially slated to happen on 9 September instead but the Proton rocket's arrival from Moscow  was delayed.

It is placed at a longitude of 61° W in order to serve South America. It would provide internet connectivity to around 500,000 people in the region, and opens 500 new television channels.

See also 
Hispasat

References 

2017 in spaceflight
Communications satellites
Communications satellites in geostationary orbit
Satellites in geostationary orbit
Satellites using the SSL 1300 bus
Satellites of Spain
Spacecraft launched in 2017